Yue "Jennifer" Wu (born January 4, 1990) is a Chinese American table tennis player originally from China who has been named to the U.S. team at the 2016 Summer Olympics. She was a gold medalist in women's team and women's singles at the 2015 Pan American Games, which qualified her for the 2016 Olympic Games.

Personal life 
Wu grew up in Beijing, China and began playing table tennis at age 8. She moved to the United States in 2008. She was given the American name Jennifer, but says she identifies more with her given name Yue.

Wu has been a resident of Fort Lee, New Jersey.

References 

Living people
American female table tennis players
American sportspeople of Chinese descent
1990 births
People from Fort Lee, New Jersey
Sportspeople from Bergen County, New Jersey
Table tennis players at the 2015 Pan American Games
Pan American Games gold medalists for the United States
Table tennis players at the 2016 Summer Olympics
Olympic table tennis players of the United States
Pan American Games medalists in table tennis
Table tennis players from Beijing
Naturalised table tennis players
Table tennis players at the 2019 Pan American Games
Medalists at the 2015 Pan American Games
Medalists at the 2019 Pan American Games
21st-century American women